The Encyclopedia Magica is a four-volume series of accessories for the 2nd edition of the Advanced Dungeons & Dragons fantasy role-playing game, published in 1994–1995.

Contents
Encyclopedia Magica is a four-volume set that aims to cover every magic item in existence in the AD&D world, from Abacus of Calculation to Zwieback of Zymurgy. The series lists all of the AD&D magical items from two decades of TSR products—every boxed set, accessory, and magazine article. The books total more than 1500 pages across the four volumes, and are bound in a plastic jacket. Entries for the series were culled from the Dungeon Master's Guide, the Basic and Expert Sets, modules and campaign settings, and Dragon and other magazines.

The fourth volume contains an index to the entire set, and a complete magic item random determination table, and includes some of the most numerous categories with entries on swords, staves, and wands. There was "no attempt to correct rule imbalances, edit entries, or even match game mechanics to one particular edition of the game".

Publication history
Encyclopedia Magica was a result of compilation and development by Dale "slade" Henson, and was published by TSR. Encyclopedia Magica Volume One was released in 1994, while Encyclopedia Magica Volume Two was printed in February 1995, Encyclopedia Magica Volume Three was printed in May 1995, and Encyclopedia Magica Volume Four was printed in November 1995. Development and editing was by Doug Stewart. Interior black and white art for the series was by Arnie Swekel, while the four volumes featured interior color art variously by Gerald Brom, Clyde Caldwell, Jeff Easley, Fred Fields, Tim Hildebrandt, Jennell Jaquays, John and Laura Lakey, Roger Loveless, Keith Parkinson, Roger Raupp, and Robh Ruppel.

"The credits acknowledge James M. Ward, 'for laughing when he heard slade had this project'".

Reception
In Dragon magazine #218 (June 1995), Rick Swan stated that these reference books possess "a diligence on the part of the researchers that borders on the superhuman".  He said the series "A must for Dungeon Masters who want to spruce up their campaigns, and for every TSR contributor who longs to see his masterpiece immortalized in an upscale format."

Cliff Ramshaw reviewed Encyclopedia Magica Volume Four for Arcane magazine, rating it a 4 out of 10 overall. He wrote that it was Mostly for completists and that the items presented in the fourth volume were often silly.

The Encyclopedia Magica, Volume 1 won the Origins Award for Best Roleplaying Supplement of 1994.

Reviews
 Pyramid #15
Rollespilsmagasinet Fønix (Danish) (Issue 8 - May/June 1995)

Notes

References

Dungeons & Dragons sourcebooks
Origins Award winners
Role-playing game supplements introduced in 1994